The small Japanese mole (Mogera imaizumii) is a species of mammal in the family Talpidae. It is endemic to Japan. Even though they are extinct in central Tokyo, they are found in the grounds of the Imperial Palace.

References

Endemic mammals of Japan
Mogera
Taxonomy articles created by Polbot
Mammals described in 1936
Taxa named by Nagamichi Kuroda